John Allen Shauck (March 26, 1841 – January 3, 1918) was a Republican politician in the U.S. State of Ohio who was an Ohio Supreme Court Judge 1895–1914.

John Allen Shauck was born on a farm near Johnsville, Morrow County, Ohio to Elah Shauck and Barbara (née Haldeman) Shauck. He attended private and public schools there. In 1864 he graduated from Otterbein University and entered 100 days service in the 136th Ohio Infantry during the American Civil War. In 1867 he graduated from the University of Michigan Law School. He moved to Kansas City, Kansas for a year, then returned to Ohio, establishing a practice in Dayton in 1868.

Shauck continued a private practice until 1884, when he was elected as a Republican to the Circuit Court Judgeship of the Second Circuit. He was re-elected in 1889.

At the 1894 State Republican Convention, Shauck defeated James Latimer Price  and incumbent Franklin J. Dickman for the nomination, and Democrat James D. Ermston in the General election for State Supreme Court Justice. He remained on the court until the end of 1914.

Starting in 1900, he was professor of law at The Ohio State University, and was president of the Ohio State Bar Association in 1917.

He died January 3, 1918 at Columbus. His funeral was at Trinity Episcopal Church, with burial at Woodland Cemetery, Dayton, Ohio.

Shauck married Ada May Phillips on June 1, 1876 in Centralia, Illinois. They had two children.

Notes

References

External links
 

Ohio lawyers
Justices of the Ohio Supreme Court
Ohio Republicans
People from Morrow County, Ohio
Politicians from Dayton, Ohio
Otterbein University alumni
University of Michigan Law School alumni
1841 births
1918 deaths
Ohio State University faculty
Burials at Woodland Cemetery and Arboretum
People of Ohio in the American Civil War
Union Army soldiers
19th-century American judges
19th-century American lawyers